A Quiet Place to Die is the second studio album by Australian metalcore band Alpha Wolf. It was released on 25 September 2020 through Greyscale Records and SharpTone Records. The first single "Akudama" was released on 2 June 2020, followed by another single "Creep" which was released on 22 July 2020, and "Bleed 4 You" on August 12, 2020. The album debuted at No. 6 on the ARIA Albums Chart in its first week of release.

Critical reception

A Quiet Place to Die received generally positive reviews, with Kris Pugh of Distorted Sound Magazine giving it an 8 out of 10, saying the album "isn’t just a statement of the band’s true arrival, but is one of the great extreme/hardcore records of recent memory."

Track listing

Personnel
Alpha Wolf
 Lochie Keogh – lead vocals
 John Arnold – bass, vocals
 Sabian Lynch – guitars
 Scottie Simpson – guitars
 Mitch Fogarty – drums
Additional personnel
 Lizi Blanco – vocals on track 7
Production
 Lance Prenc – mastering, mixing

Charts

Awards

! 
|-
| 2021|| A Quiet Place to Die || ARIA Award for Best Hard Rock or Heavy Metal Album || 
| 
|-

References

2020 albums
Alpha Wolf (band) albums